This is a list of writers, including novelists, essayists, poets, playwrights, and journalists, who were born in Spain or whose writings are closely associated with that country.

A 
Iñaki Abad (born 1963), novelist and journalist
Pedro Antonio de Alarcón (1833–1891), novelist
Rafael Alberti (1902–1999), poet, Cervantes Prize laureate (1983)
Vicente Alberti y Vidal (1786–1859), writer
José Alcalá Galiano (1843–1919), writer, poet and humorist
Baltasar del Alcázar (1530–1606), poet
Ignacio Aldecoa (1925–1969), novelist and poet
Mateo Alemán (1547–c. 1609), novelist
Vicente Aleixandre (1888–1984), poet, Nobel Prize laureate (1977)
Florina Alías (1921-1999), writer
Dámaso Alonso (1898–1990), poet, Cervantes Prize laureate (1978)
Núria Añó (b. 1973), novelist and biographer
Tomás de Añorbe y Corregel (1686–1741), playwright and poet
Jerónimo de Arbolanche (1546–1572), writer
Juan de Arguijo (1567–1623), writer, poet and musician during the Spanish Golden Age
Juan Ariza (1816–1876), Romantic novelist, poet, and playwright 
Raimon Arola (born 1956), art historian specializing in sacred symbolism and hermetic tradition
Alfonso Clemente de Arostegui y Cañavate (1698–1774), Catholic bishop, writer, lawyer, and diplomat
Francisco Asensi (1936–2013), religious writer
Francisco Ayala (1906–2009), novelist, Cervantes Prize laureate (1991)
Wenceslao Ayguals de Izco (1801–1873), writer and editor
Azorín (José Martínez Ruiz) (1863–1967), journalist, poet, novelist and essayist

B 
Frutos Baeza (1861–1918), poet and writer in the Murcian dialect
Gaspar de Baeza (1540–1569), humanist, lawyer, translator and writer known during the Spanish Golden Age
Ricardo Baeza Durán (1890–1956)
Rafael Balanzat y Baranda (1820–1854), writer and military man
Andrés Baquero (1853–1916), teacher, researcher, and writer
Elia Barceló (born 1957), writer
Juan Barcia Caballero (1852–1926), Spanish physician and writer
Pío Baroja (1872–1956), novelist of the Generation of '98
Pedro Barrantes (1850–1912), writer, journalist
Joaquín Bastús (1799–1873), writer and pedagogue
Gustavo Adolfo Bécquer (1836–1870), romantic poet and tale writer
Diego Beltrán Hidalgo (17th century), poet and critic
Jacinto Benavente (1866–1954), dramatist, Nobel Prize laureate (1922)
Francisco Bermúdez de Pedraza (1585–1655), writer, jurist and historian
Joan Binimelis (1538–1616), scientist and writer
Vicente Blasco Ibáñez (1867–1928), novelist, wrote The Four Horsemen of the Apocalypse (1916)
Isidoro Bosarte (1747–1807), historian and writer
Vicente Botín, journalist
Antonio Buero Vallejo (1916–2000), playwright of the Generation of '36

C 

Cabret (late 14th century), translator
Javier Cacho Gomez (born 1952), scientific writer and novelist
Fernando Cagigal (1756–1824), poet and playwright
Pedro Calderón de la Barca (1600–1681), playwright and poet of the Spanish Golden Age
Luis Carandell Robusté (1929–2002), journalist and writer
Manuel Casal (1751–1837), poet and polymath
Félix Casanova de Ayala (1915–1990), poet
Francisco Cascales (1564–1642), humanist and writer
Alejandro Casona (1903–1965)
Abraham Castanho, (mid 17th century), poet
José Manuel Castañón (1920–2001), novelist and essayist
Rosalía de Castro (1837–1885), romanticist and poet
Juan Francisco de Castro Fernández (1721–1790), priest, lawyer and writer 
José Carlos Cataño (born 1954), poet
José Joaquín Casasús (1733–1822), writer
Camilo José Cela (1916–2002), novelist, Nobel Prize laureate (1989)
Pancracio Celdrán (1942–2019), academic and journalist
Francisco Cerdá y Rico (1739–1800), humanist, jurist and writer
Francisco Cerecedo (1940–1977), journalist
Miguel de Cervantes (1547–1616), novelist, poet and playwright, author of Don Quixote 
Clarín (Leopoldo Alas) (1852–1901), novelist
Gerónimo de la Concepción (1642–1698), writer
Andrés del Corral (1748–1818), writer and archeologist
Javier Cosnava (born 1971), novelist
Eusebio Cuerno de la Cantolla (1850–1922), journalist and businessman

D
Filomena Dato (1856-1926), feminist, writer
Pedro Víctor Debrigode (1914–1982), novelist
Miguel Delibes (1920–2010), novelist, Cervantes Prize laureate (1993)
Demófilo (1848–1893)
Agustín Díaz Pacheco (born 1953), journalist and novelist
Gerardo Diego (1896–1987), poet, Cervantes Prize laureate (1979)
Rafael Dieste (1899–1981)
María Magdalena Domínguez (1922-2021), poet 
María Dueñas (born 1964)

E–F 
José Echegaray (1832–1916), dramatist, Nobel Prize laureate (1904)
Francisco de Enciso Zárate, (?–1570), writer of chivalric romance novels
Feliciana Enríquez de Guzmán (1569–c. 1644), playwright of the Spanish Golden Age
Antonio Escohotado (1941–2021), philosopher and essayist
Juan Escoiquiz (1762–1820), ecclesiastic, politician and writer
Vicente Espinel (1550–1624), poet and novelist
José de Espronceda (1808–1842), romantic poet
Cristina Fernández Cubas (born 1945), novelist and short story writer
César Fernández García (born 1967), novelist
Leandro Fernández de Moratín (1760–1828), dramatist and neoclassical poet

G-H 

José María Gabriel y Galán (1870–1905), poet
Antonio Gala (born 1930), poet, dramatist and novelist
Rafael Gambra Ciudad (1920–2004), philosopher and author
Gabriel García-Badell (1936–1994), writer
Juan García Hortelano (1928–1992)
María Esther García López (born, 1948), poet and writer; president, Asturias Writers Association
Vincent García de la Huerta (1734–1787), dramatist, poet, and critic
Federico García Lorca (1898–1936), poet and dramatist of the Generation of '27
Ignacio García Malo (1760–1812), playwright, translator, and writer
Luis García San Miguel (1929–2006), jurist and author
Juan Givanel (1868–1946), philologist and literary critic
Ramón Gómez de la Serna (1888–1963), writer, dramatist and avant-garde agitator
Luis de Góngora (1561–1627), lyric poet considered to be among the most prominent Spanish poets of all time
Beremundo González Rodríguez (1909–1986), Galician writer and politician
Enriqueta González Rubín (1832-1877), Asturian writer
Juan Goyanarte (1900–1955), editor and writer
Baltasar Gracián (1601–1658), Baroque prose writer and philosopher
Josep Guijarro Triadó (born 1967), writer and journalist
Jorge Guillén (1893–1984), poet, Cervantes Prize laureate (1976), four-time Nobel Prize nominee
Miguel Hernández (1910–1942), poet
Carla Herrero (born 1994), writer, blogger
Juan López de Hoyos (1511–1583), Renaissance author

I–L 
Antonio Iturbe (born 1967), journalist, professor, and editor
Juan Antonio de Iza Zamácola (1756–1826), journalist, historian and writer
Pablo de Jérica (1781–1841), writer and journalist
Juan Ramón Jiménez (1881–1958), poet, Nobel Prize laureate (1956)
John of the Cross (1542–1591), mystic poet
Gaspar Melchor de Jovellanos (1744–1811), major figure of the Spanish Age of Enlightenment, philosopher, statesman, poet and essayist
Robert Juan-Cantavella (born 1976), novelist and editor
Jon Juaristi (born 1951), poet and essayist
Juana Teresa Juega López (1885-1979), poet
Use Lahoz (born 1976), novelist
Mariano José de Larra (1809–1837), literary journalist
Fray Luis de León (1527–1591), poet of the Spanish Golden Age
Antonio F. Lera (born 1952), writer, translator, journalist, and publisher
Julio Llamazares (born 1955), poet, novelist and journalist
Jorge Llopis (1919–1976), satirist and playwright
Francisco de Paula López de Castro (1771–1827), Neoclassical poet and writer

M 

Antonio Machado (1875–1939), leading poet of the Generation of '98
Salvador de Madariaga (1886–1978), essayist and two-time Nobel Prize nominee
César Mallorquí (born 1953)
José Mallorquí Figuerola (1913–1972)
Pedro Malón de Chaide (1530–1589), religious author
Jorge Manrique (1440–1479), major Castilian poet
Manuel Mantero (born 1930), poet and literary critic
José María Díaz (1813–1888), Romantic journalist and playwright 
Salvador María Granés (1840–1911), journalist and author of comic theatre
Francisco Mariano Nipho (1719–1803), writer and journalist
Javier Marías (1951–2022), novelist and translator
Ferrán Marín Ramos (born 1974), writer in Aragonese, Catalan and Spanish
Manuel Marliani Cassens (1795–1873), writer, diplomat, and politician 
Juan Marquez (1565–1621), ascetic writer
Juan Marsé (1933–2020), novelist and Cervantes prize laureate
Rossend Marsol Clua (1922–2006), journalist and writer
Alfons Marti (born 1968), writer
Carmen Martín Gaite (1925–2000), novelist, essayist, and author of short stories
Pablo Martín Asuero (born 1967), academic in Oriental studies
Francisco Martínez Motiño
Manuel Martínez Barrionuevo (1857–1917), poet and writer
Pedro Luis Martínez Larriba (born 1946), playwright
Augusto Martínez Olmedilla] (1880–1965), novelist and journalist 
Joanot Martorell (1413–1468), author of the first novel, Tirant lo Blanc (1490)
Juan Francisco Masdeu, Jesuit historian
Juan María Maury (1772–1845), writer
Patricia Mayayo (born 1967), art historian
Gonçal Mayos Solsona (born 1957), philosopher and essayist
Fernando Rodríguez Méndez, journalist and novelist
Ramón Mendezona Roldán (1913–2001), journalist
Rodrigo Méndez Silva (1606–1670), historian, genealogist, geographer and writer
Eduardo Mendoza (born 1943), novelist and Cervantes prize laureate
Juan González Mesa (born 1975)
Agustín Millares Sall (1917–1989), poet
Juan Millé Giménez (1884–1945), writer and professor of literature
Domingo Miras (1934–2022), dramatist
José Manuel Mójica Legarre (born 1955), writer
Tirso de Molina (1571–1648), playwright
Gaspar de Molina y Zaldívar (1741–1806), architect, painter, poet and writer
Francisco Antonio de Monteser (c. 1620–1668), dramatist of the Spanish Golden Age]
Francisco Morales Lomas (b.1957), poet
Agustín Moreto y Cavana (1618–1661), dramatist and playwright
José Luis Munárriz (1752–1830), literary critic, translator and writer
Juan Jacinto Muñoz Rengel (born 1974), novelist

O-Q 

Ramón Ortega y Frías (1825–1883), writer
José Ortega y Gasset (1883–1955), essayist
José Ovejero (born 1958), novelist, essayist and poet
Juan Lorenzo Obras se Palmireno (1514/1524–1579/1580), playwright and educator
Constanza Ossorio (1595–1637), poet and writer
Carmelo Palomino Kayser (1952–2000), poet
Emilia Pardo Bazán (1851–1921), writer of prose and poetry who introduced naturalism and feminist ideas to Spanish literature 
Jerónimo de Pasamonte (1553–after 1605), writer during the Spanish Golden Age
Paul Pen (born 1979), author of literary fiction, thriller and suspense
Andrés Pascual (born 1969), novelist
Benito Pérez Galdós (1843–1920), realist novelist considered by some to be second only to Cervantes in stature as a Spanish novelist
Narcisa Pérez Reoyo (1849-1876), writer
Arturo Pérez-Reverte (born 1951), best-selling novelist and journalist, member of the Royal Spanish Academy
Marta Pessarrodona (born 1941), poet, literary critic, essayist, biographer
Francisco Pi y Arsuaga (1865–1912)
Francesc Pi i Margall (1824–1901), romanticist writer who was briefly president of the short-lived First Spanish Republic
Berta Piñán (born 1963), writer, poet, politician
Francisco de Pisa (1534–1616), Spanish historian and writer
José Antonio Porcel (1715–1794), poet and writer
Miguel de Portilla y Esquivel (1660–1732), writer
Gervasio Posadas (1962), novelist
Santiago Posteguillo (born 1967), novelist
Luz Pozo Garza (1922-2020), poet
Núria Pradas (born 1954), Spanish philologist and writer
Isabel Prieto de Landázuri (1833–1876), poet and dramatist
James Prohens (1911–2007), Spanish-American poet
Francisco de Quevedo (1580–1645), novelist, essayist and poet, master of Conceptism
Eduardo Quiles (born 1940), playwright and writer
Raúl Quinto (born 1978), poet and essayist

R 
Juan Antonio Ramírez Domínguez (1948–2009), essayist
Manuel Ramírez Fernández de Córdoba (1948–2007), journalist
Miguel del Rey Vicente, military historian
José Amador de los Ríos (1818–1878) historian, archaeologist, art and literature
David Roas (born 1965), short story writer and critic
Fátima Rodríguez (b. 1961), writer, translator
Pepe Rodríguez (born 1953)
Rafael Rodríguez Mohedano (1725–1787), historian and writer
Fernando de Rojas (1465–1541), novelist, author of La Celestina (1499)
Carlos Rojas Vila (1928–2020)
Francisco de Rojas Zorrilla (1607–1660), dramatist
Luis Romero (1916–2009)
Juan Ruiz de Alarcón (c. 1581–1639), dramatist
Víctor Ruiz Iriarte (1912–1982), dramatist
Carlos Ruiz Zafón (born 1964), best-selling novelist

S 
Luis Sáenz de la Calzada (1912–1994), poet
Pedro Salinas (1891–1951), poet
Félix María Samaniego (1745–1801)
Manuel Sánchez Cuesta (born 1942), philosopher
Agustín Sánchez Vidal (born 1948), novelist
Fernando Sánchez Dragó (born 1936)
Miguel de los Santos Álvarez (1818–1892), romantic writer
Marta Segarra (born 1963), philologist, university professor, and researcher
Ramón J. Sender (1901–1982), novelist and journalist
Manuel Siles Artés (1921–1984), writer
Antonio Soler (born 1956), novelist
Dolores Soler-Espiauba (born 1935), novelist

T-U 
Diego Tadeo González (1733–1794), poet
Sofía Tartilán (1829-1888), novelist, essayist, journalist, editor
Enrique Tierno Galván (1918–1986), essayist and lawyer who served as Mayor of Madrid from 1979 to 1986
Juan Tizón (1895–1945), writer and politician
Saulo Torón Navarro (1885–1974), poet
Gonzalo Torrente Ballester (1910–1999), novelist
Domingo Traggia (1744–1816), military academic, historian and writer
Juan Manuel Trujillo (1907–1976), essayist and publisher
Fernando Trujillo Sanz
Pablo Tusset (born 1965), novelist
Miguel de Unamuno (1864–1936), Basque essayist, novelist, poet, playwright, philosopher, professor of Greek and Classics, and later rector at the University of Salamanca
Chusé Raúl Usón, publisher and a Spanish writer in the Aragonese language

V 

Antonio Valladares de Sotomayor (1737–1820), playwright, poet and journalist
Ramón María del Valle-Inclán (1866–1936), radical dramatist, novelist and member of the Generation of '98
José Rafael Valles Calatrava (born 1957), academic author and professor
Juan Antonio Vallejo-Nágera Botas (1926–1990)
Maria Vallejo-Nágera (born 1967), writer in Spanish
Diego Valverde Villena (born 1967), poet and essayist 
Alberto Vázquez-Figueroa (born 1936), novelist
Alonso Vázquez (155?–1615)
Manuel Vázquez Montalbán (1939–2003), writer
Garcilaso de la Vega (1501–1536), Renaissance poet who was influential in introducing Italian Renaissance verse forms, poetic techniques, and themes to Spain
"El Inca" Garcilaso de la Vega (1539–1616), first mestizo author in Spanish language, known for his chronicles of Inca history
Félix Lope de Vega (1562–1635), one of the key literary figures of the Spanish Golden Age
José Miguel Vilar-Bou (born 1979), short story writer and novelist

Y-Z 
Josep Yxart (1852–1895), writer and translator
María de Zayas y Sotomayor (1590–1660), female novelist of the Spanish Golden Age, and one of the first Spanish feminist authors
José Zorrilla y Moral (1817–1893), poet and dramatist, author of Don Juan Tenorio (1844)

See also
List of Spanish women writers
List of Spanish-language authors
List of Spaniards

References

-
Spanish writers, List of
Writers
Writers